The Phoenix Mountains Preserve (sometimes called the Phoenix Mountain Preserve) is a group of parks located among the Phoenix Mountains in Phoenix, Arizona, United States. The Phoenix Mountains Park and Recreation Area (better known as Piestewa Peak; formerly Squaw Peak), the first of these parks to be preserved, has been designated as a Phoenix Point of Pride. 

Two of the parks rank among the world's largest city parks (along with McDowell Sonoran Preserve in Scottsdale, Arizona).

Parks 
The parks include:

 Piestewa Peak recreation area (formerly known as Squaw Peak; officially named the Phoenix Mountains Park and Recreation Area)
 Dreamy Draw Recreation Area, the trailhead and northern part of this park
 Camelback Mountain Park
 Papago Park
 Lookout Mountain Preserve
 North Mountain and Shaw Butte Preserves
 Phoenix Sonoran Preserve (under development)

Additionally, South Mountain Park is sometimes included in this group.

These parks largely consist of small mountains and adjacent foothills that reach about 2,000 feet (roughly 600 meters) above the desert floor.  They also interrupt the checkerboard pattern of Phoenix's built environment and are quite prominent, especially since most of the city is flat and gridded.  Since the largest part of the Phoenix metropolitan area sits at just over 1,000 feet (around 300 meters) above sea level, that means most of the peaks reach about 3,000 feet (under 1,000 meters) above sea level.

Originally, the park system began with Piestewa Mountain Park and North Mountain Park as county parks.  However, most of the existing municipal park system was acquired in the early 1970s when Phoenix's ever-expanding development threatened to encroach on these mountainous areas.  All feature extensive hiking trails and many have public access areas with parking, ramadas (picnic tables) and restrooms.  Some offer nearby horse stables where horses can be rented and ridden into the park.

See also

List of historic properties in Phoenix, Arizona
Cave Creek Regional Park, a Maricopa County park
Lake Pleasant Regional Park, a Maricopa County park
Spur Cross Ranch Conservation Area, a  Maricopa County park
Usery Mountain Park,  a Maricopa County park

References

External links
Phoenix Mountain Parks/Preserves and Hiking Trails at City of Phoenix
Phoenix Mountains Preservation Council
Maps of the Phoenix Mountain Preserve
Lookout Mountain Park
History of the Phoenix Mountains Preserve at Arizona State University

Phoenix Points of Pride
Parks in Phoenix, Arizona